Derrick Tshimanga (born 6 November 1988) is a Belgian professional footballer of Congolese descent who plays as a left-back for Challenger Pro League club Beveren. As of 2021, he is playing for Waasland-Beveren in the Belgian First Division B.

Personal life
Katuku is born in Congo and emigrated to Belgium at a young age. He is the older brother of Holly Tshimanga, a youth international for Belgium.

Honours
Genk
Belgian Cup: 2012–13

References

External links
 
 

1988 births
Living people
Belgian footballers
Belgium international footballers
Belgium youth international footballers
Belgian expatriate footballers
Belgian expatriate sportspeople in the Netherlands
Expatriate footballers in the Netherlands
Democratic Republic of the Congo footballers
Belgian people of Democratic Republic of the Congo descent
Democratic Republic of the Congo emigrants to Belgium
K.S.C. Lokeren Oost-Vlaanderen players
K.R.C. Genk players
Willem II (football club) players
Oud-Heverlee Leuven players
S.K. Beveren players
Belgian Pro League players
Challenger Pro League players
Association football defenders
Footballers from Kinshasa